Casserley is a surname. Notable people with the surname include:

H. C. Casserley (1903–1991), British railway photographer
Lawrence Casserley (born 1941), British composer, conductor, and performer
Rob Casserley, British surgeon and mountaineer

See also
Casserly